Why I Sing the Blues is a 1983 album by the blues guitarist and singer B.B. King. Originally made by MCA Records as a bargain-bin greatest hits compilation, the album is a showcase of King's best work from the late 1960s and early 1970s. The album was released in CD format in 1992.

Track listing
"The Thrill Is Gone" (Roy Hawkins, Rick Darnell) - 5:24
"Ghetto Woman" (Riley King, Clark) - 5:14
"Why I Sing the Blues" (Riley King, Clark) - 8:38
"Ain't Nobody Home" (Jerry Ragovoy) - 3:34
"Hummingbird" (Leon Russell) - 4:32
"To Know You Is to Love You" (Stevie Wonder, Syreeta Wright) - 8:31
"How Blue Can You Get?" (Jane Feather, Leonard Feather) - 5:08
"Sweet Sixteen" (Doc Pomus) - 7:01
"So Excited" (Jerry Jemmott, Riley King) - 5:34
"Chains and Things" (with Carole King) (Riley King, Clark) - 4:55

References

B.B. King compilation albums
MCA Records compilation albums
1983 greatest hits albums